Arthur Henry Feagin (March 7, 1878 – March 25, 1932) was a college football player.

Auburn University
Feagin was a prominent halfback for John Heisman's Auburn Tigers football teams of the Alabama Polytechnic Institute. At Auburn he was a member of Phi Delta Theta.

1899
Feagin was captain and All-Southern in 1899. In Heisman's opinion this was his best team while at Auburn. The team was the only one to score on Sewanee's "Iron Men." A report of the game says "Feagin is a player of exceptional ability, and runs with such force that some ground belongs to him on every attempt."

References

External links

American football halfbacks
Auburn Tigers football players
All-Southern college football players
Players of American football from Alabama
19th-century players of American football
1878 births
1932 deaths
People from Bullock County, Alabama